Laura Bingham (aka Laura Stafford) (born 1993), is an English explorer and adventurer best known for leading the world first descent of the Essequibo River in Guyana, South America. She appeared on the cover of British Airways High Life magazine in 2017 alongside Sir Ranulph Fiennes, Ed Stafford (her husband) and Tim Peake and was referred to as "The Adventurer".

Biography 
Laura Bingham was born and brought up in the English countryside and is the youngest of four sisters. While growing up, she enjoyed numerous family trips to South Africa, exploring different cultures. Bingham also attended a South African school for a short term, strengthening her passion for travel and exploring other parts of the world. She attended Westgate secondary school and then Peter Symonds College in Winchester, her home town. Bingham wrote a list of everything that she wanted to do in her life. She left home at the age of 18 to travel the world and made it her mission to complete as many of these goals as possible.

In 2014 Bingham traveled to Mexico where she taught English with her TEFL qualification. Whilst in Mexico she also became involved with jaguar conservation work with the government. Throughout these four months, Bingham learned Spanish to an intermediate level.

Having then earned enough money to return to Britain, in May 2014 Bingham opted out of flying home and instead chose to sail the Atlantic as part of a crew (two men and a cat called Cuba) for a 38 ft Trimaran which took 2 months.

In January 2016, Bingham travelled across South America from west coast to east coast by bike. Sir Ranulph Fiennes commented that 'Laura is a very brave person, this is a risky undertaking.' With only the equipment she could carry with her, she cycled 7,000 km over 164 days, from Manta on the Pacific coast of Ecuador, through Peru, Bolivia and Paraguay, to arrive at her final destination in Buenos Aires, on Argentina's Atlantic coast, on 1 July 2016. Bingham journeyed across South America with no money, relying on human kindness and generosity, whilst raising awareness for the UK based charity Operation South America.

In April 2018, Bingham conceived, organised and led a descent of the Essequibo River in Guyana. She is an ambassador for the Children's Air Ambulance charity.

Personal life
Bingham lives in Leicestershire, England with her husband and fellow explorer, Ed Stafford.

On 6 June 2017, Stafford announced via Twitter that Bingham had given birth to a baby boy. On 26 August 2020, Bingham gave birth to twin girls – Mary and Camilla.

References

External links 
 

English explorers
British bloggers
1993 births
Living people
People from Harborough District